The 1985–86 Kansas Jayhawks men's basketball team represented the University of Kansas during the 1985–86 NCAA Division I men's basketball season. One major rule change that took effect during the season was the introduction of the shot clock.

Roster

Schedule

|-
!colspan=8| Regular season

|-
!colspan=8| Big 8 Tournament

|-
!colspan=8| NCAA Tournament

References

Kansas Jayhawks men's basketball seasons
Kansas
NCAA Division I men's basketball tournament Final Four seasons
Kansas
Kansas Jay
Kansas Jay